Fabienne Peter is a Swiss ice hockey player playing for EHC Basel KLH Ladies as of 2018.

In autumn 2018, Peter became the first transgender woman to play in a Swiss ice hockey league. In response to her application to join EHC Basel's women's team, the Swiss Ice Hockey association unanimously adopted a policy that allowed transgender players to take part in the sport, based on the guidelines of the International Olympic Committee.

References

Swiss ice hockey players
Transgender women 
Transgender sportswomen
Living people
Year of birth missing (living people)
LGBT ice hockey players
Swiss LGBT sportspeople